Oliver Smith may refer to:

Oliver Smith (actor) (born 1952), English actor, known for the Hellraiser film series
Oliver Smith (designer) (1918–1994), American scenic designer, one of the founders of American Ballet Theatre
Oliver Smith (politician) (born 1993), British Liberal Democrat politician
Oliver Smith (cricketer) (born 1967), English cricketer
Oliver H. Smith (1794–1859), American politician, U.S. Representative and Senator from Indiana
Oliver P. Smith (1893–1977), American U.S. Marine Corps general
Ollie Smith (rugby union, born 1982), English rugby player
Ollie Smith (rugby union, born 2000), Scottish rugby union player
Ollie Smith (American football) (born 1949), American football player
Ollie Smith (baseball) (1865–1954), American baseball player
Olly Smith (born 1974), British TV presenter
Olliver Smith (1898–1965), Norwegian modern pentathlete
Oliver Smith (football coach) (born 1960), Turks and Caicos Islands football manager

See also  
Olive Smith (cricketer) (1923–2014), known as Ollie, Australian cricket player